Venusberg is a 1963 West German comedy drama film directed by Rolf Thiele and starring Marisa Mell, Nicole Badal, and Monica Ekman.

Cast

References

Bibliography

External links 
 

1963 films
West German films
German comedy-drama films
1963 comedy-drama films
1960s German-language films
Films directed by Rolf Thiele
Films featuring an all-female cast
1960s German films